Adelomelon ancilla is a species of sea snail, a marine gastropod mollusk in the family Volutidae, the volutes.

Distribution and habitat
This marine species occurs off Uruguay, Argentina, Chile, and Falkland Islands.

References

 Bail, P & Poppe, G. T. 2001. A conchological iconography: a taxonomic introduction of the recent Volutidae. Hackenheim-Conchbook, 30 pp, 5 pl.

External links

 Rochebrune A.-T. de & Mabille, J. (1889). Mollusques. in: Mission Scientifique du Cap Horn 1882-1883. Tome 6 (Zoologie 2, part 8). Paris, Gauthiers-Villars. H.1-H.129, pls. 1-8

Volutidae
Gastropods described in 1786